"Temple of Love" is a song by English rock band The Sisters of Mercy, released as a non-album single in 1983. 

After being out of print for years, the song was re-recorded in 1992 as "Temple of Love (1992)" featuring Israeli singer Ofra Haza. This version became the band's biggest hit in its native United Kingdom, peaking at number three on the UK Singles Chart. It also reached the top five in Germany, the top 20 in Austria and Ireland, and the top 25 in Sweden.

Background 
"Temple of Love", written by the band's lead singer Andrew Eldritch, was the fifth single released by The Sisters of Mercy. It did not chart on the United Kingdom's main singles chart, but it reached number one for a week on the UK Indie Chart and stayed on the chart for 36 weeks.

"Temple of Love (1992)" 
Following the release of the band's third album Vision Thing in 1990, there appeared to be no plans for a new record anytime soon, leading the band's record label Merciful Release to reissue the band's early non-album singles and B-sides, which had been out of print at this point, on the compilation Some Girls Wander by Mistake. This included the extended 12-inch version of the original "Temple of Love" recording. In conjunction with this release, The Sisters of Mercy also recorded a new version of "Temple of Love" featuring Israeli singer Ofra Haza, whom Eldritch was a longtime fan of. 

"Temple of Love (1992)" did not appear on Some Girls Wander by Mistake, but it did appear on The Sisters of Mercy's greatest hits album A Slight Case of Overbombing, released a year later in 1993. It was produced by Eldritch, and additional production credits were given to Ian Stanley, the former Tears for Fears keyboardist.

Shortly after, the band would be reduced to just a duo of Eldritch and new guitarist Adam Pearson. 

The song does appear on the 2017 deluxe reissue of Some Girls Wander by Mistake.

Track listing

Charts

Weekly charts

"Temple of Love"

"Temple of Love (1992)"

Year-end charts

"Temple of Love (1992)"

References 

1983 singles
1992 singles
The Sisters of Mercy songs
Gothic rock songs